Becker Townshipmay refer to:

Becker Township, Roberts County, South Dakota, in Roberts County, South Dakota
Becker Township, Cass County, Minnesota
Becker Township, Sherburne County, Minnesota

Township name disambiguation pages